Thet Zin is an editor of the Myanmar Nation weekly journal. He was arrested on 28 February 2008 for having a copy of a United Nations human rights report, a violation of the Printers and Publishers Act. He was sentenced to seven years in prison.

References

Burmese journalists
Living people
Year of birth missing (living people)
Burmese editors
Place of birth missing (living people)